Turčin is a village in Croatia. It is connected by the D3 highway and R201 railway.

References

Populated places in Varaždin County